Chicago Place is a mixed-use high-rise on the 700 block of North Michigan Avenue (between Huron and Superior) in Chicago along the Magnificent Mile anchored by Saks Fifth Avenue. According to the Chicago Tribune, as of February 2009, the mall portion has been closed and is now a T-Mobile Store as well as offices. Above that is a tower containing condominiums.

Notable stores
Saks Fifth Avenue
Zara

See also
 Chicago architecture
 50 tallest buildings in the U.S.
 List of tallest buildings in Chicago
 List of towers
 World's tallest structures

References

External links

Emporis Listing

Residential buildings completed in 1991
Shopping malls in Chicago
Residential condominiums in Chicago
Residential skyscrapers in Chicago
1991 establishments in Illinois

Skidmore, Owings & Merrill buildings
Defunct shopping malls in the United States
Streeterville, Chicago